Hannelore Raepke (born Hannelore Sadau; 25 October 1935) is a German sprinter. She competed in the women's 100 metres at the 1960 Summer Olympics. Raepke was a competitor at the 1958 European Athletics Championships and 1962 European Athletics Championships. During these events, her best finish was during the 200 metres in 1958, where she was second.

References

External links
 

1935 births
Living people
Athletes (track and field) at the 1960 Summer Olympics
German female sprinters
Olympic athletes of the United Team of Germany
Place of birth missing (living people)
Olympic female sprinters